Isuf Keçi was an Albanian politician and mayor of Tirana from 1950 through 1951. He was arrested after being found to participate in activities against the Communist Party of Albania.

References

Year of birth missing
Year of death missing
Mayors of Tirana